Alma Wheeler Smith (born August 6, 1941) is a politician from the U.S. state of Michigan. She was most recently a member of the Michigan House of Representatives, representing the 54th District, which includes the city of Ypsilanti, Augusta Township, Salem Township, Superior Township, and Ypsilanti Township in Washtenaw County, from 2005 to 2010. A Democrat, she sat on the powerful House Appropriations Committee, served two terms in the Michigan Senate from 1995 to 2002, and sought her party's nomination for Governor of Michigan in 2010.

Early career
Early in her career, Smith worked as a cable commissioner, school board trustee, school board president, and county commissioner. She served as a State Senator representing Ann Arbor in the 18th District for eight years before term limits ended her tenure in that body.

State Representative
In the Michigan House of Representatives, Smith has introduced bills on a wide range of topics.

She served in the Michigan House from January 1, 2005 until December 31, 2010, having been unable to retain her House seat in 2010 due to term limits.

Gubernatorial candidate

Representative Smith has announced her candidacy for governor in 2010.  According to her campaign site, "As governor, Alma's policies and budgets will support full access to health care for each resident, equal education access and opportunity from preschool to grad school, a safe and clean environment, vital urban centers, a healthy business sector, protection for civil rights and civil liberties and full inclusion for each citizen in Michigan's benefits and opportunities."

On May 10, one day before the filing deadline for the primary, Smith announced that although she was “well on the path” to collecting enough signatures (15,000) to qualify, she had decided not to submit them. In a statement, she said that she shared a “concern of splitting the progressive vote and ending up with a candidate that does not represent core Democratic values.” “Democrats need to unify behind a candidate and I have come to believe that my continued candidacy would only serve to divide us further,” Smith said.

Family
Smith is a member of a prominent Ann Arbor political family. Her father, Albert H. Wheeler, was mayor of Ann Arbor from 1975 to 1978, and the first African American to hold that position. Her sister, Nancy Francis, has served as a Washtenaw County probate judge since 1990. Her son, Conan, served as a Washtenaw County commissioner, and was elected Chairperson of the Ann Arbor City Democratic Party in December 2008. Conan's wife, Rebekah Warren, currently represents the 18th District in the Michigan Senate, a seat Smith previously held.

References

External links
Alma Wheeler Smith's Michigan House Democrats Web Site
Gubernatorial campaign site
 Arbor Update, 25 June 2004 - Alma Wheeler Smith to be honored this Saturday at Democratic Social
 Judy McGovern, "08 election another milestone for political family," Ann Arbor News, 8 November 2008.

County commissioners in Michigan
School board members in Michigan
Democratic Party members of the Michigan House of Representatives
Politicians from Ann Arbor, Michigan
1941 births
Living people
Women state legislators in Michigan
Place of birth missing (living people)
University of Michigan College of Literature, Science, and the Arts alumni
African-American state legislators in Michigan
African-American women in politics
20th-century American politicians
20th-century American women politicians
21st-century American politicians
21st-century American women politicians
Candidates in the 2010 United States elections
20th-century African-American women
20th-century African-American politicians
21st-century African-American women
21st-century African-American politicians